The 32nd FIE Fencing World Cup began in October 2002 and concluded in October 2003 at the 2003 World Fencing Championships in Havana, Cuba.

Individual Épée

Individual Foil

Individual Sabre

Team Épée

Team Foil

Team Sabre

References 
 Annual Report  of the executive committee of the International Fencing Federation

Fencing World Cup
2003 in fencing
2004 in fencing
International fencing competitions hosted by Cuba
2004 in Cuban sport